Lam Ho Ching (born November 5, 1998) is a Hong Kong female acrobatic gymnast. With partners Carmen Gast and Ho Ching Lam, Lam Ho Ching competed in the 2014 Acrobatic Gymnastics World Championships.

References

1998 births
Living people
Hong Kong acrobatic gymnasts
Female acrobatic gymnasts